Hanif Abdurraqib (born August 25, 1983) is an American poet, essayist, and cultural critic. He is the author of 2016 poetry collection The Crown Ain't Worth Much (published as Hanif Willis-Abdurraqib), the 2017 essay collection They Can't Kill Us Until They Kill Us, the 2019 non-fiction book, Go Ahead in the Rain: Notes on A Tribe Called Quest on the American hip-hop group A Tribe Called Quest, the 2019 poetry collection A Fortune for Your Disaster, and the 2021 essay collection A Little Devil in America: Notes in Praise of Black Performance which received the  2022 Andrew Carnegie Medal for Excellence. Go Ahead in the Rain was on the long list for the 2019 National Book Award.

Early life
Abdurraqib was born on August 25, 1983, and raised in Columbus, Ohio. He was raised Muslim. He graduated from Beechcroft High School in 2001. He then attended Capital University, where he earned a degree in marketing and played on the soccer team.

Career

Poetry
Columbus is the setting for Abdurraqib's first book, a poetry collection called The Crown Ain't Worth Much (Button Poetry, July 2016). Publishers Weeklys review noted, "When Willis-Abdurraqib meditates on the dangers of being young and black in America, the power of his poetry is undeniable". The Indiana Review called the collection "expansive and rich...compassionate, elegiac." Fusion called his "poetry a crash course in emotional honesty." Writing of the collection's titular poem, The Huffington Post said Abdurraqib's "chilling take on black death is heartbreakingly true."

Abdurraqib is a Pushcart Prize nominee and a Callaloo Creative Writing Fellow. PBS's Articulate with Jim Cotter described Abdurraqib as "of a generation that is helping to redefine poetry". Blavity called Abdurraqib one of "13 Young Black Poets You Should Know". He is a poetry editor at Muzzle Magazine and a founder, with Eve Ewing, of the Echo Hotel poetry collective. He edited an anthology of poems about pop music called Again I Wait For This To Pull Apart (FreezeRay Press, 2015). In April 2017 his chapbook Vintage Sadness had a limited edition release by Big Lucks, selling out its print run of 500 copies in just under six hours. In August 2017, he was named the managing editor of Button Poetry. On September 3, 2019, Tin House released Abdurraqib's second poetry collection, A Fortune for Your Disaster.

Abdurraqib was a visiting poet teaching in the MFA program at Butler University during the fall of 2018.

Prose
Abdurraqib's writing has appeared in The Fader, The New York Times, and Pitchfork, as well as previously serving as a columnist at MTV News, writing about music, culture, and identity. The Huffington Post named his essay on Fetty Wap's song "Trap Queen" to its list of "The Most Important Writing From People of Color in 2015." Discussing Abdurraqib's essay on the late Muhammed Ali as inspiration to a generation of hip-hop artists, critic Ned Raggett called the piece a "standout" among the many elegies.

Abdurraqib's essay collection They Can't Kill Us Until They Kill Us was published in November 2017 by Two Dollar Radio. The Chicago Tribune named it to a list of "25 must-read books" for the fall of 2017 and Publishers Weekly gave it a starred review, calling the collection "mesmerizing and deeply perceptive". The book also received favorable reviews from the Chicago Tribune and The Washington Post (where Pete Tosiello described They Can't Kill Us as "a breathtaking collection of largely music-focused essays"), and The New York Times Magazine featured a passage from the collection in the magazine's "New Sentences" column. A special five year anniversary edition of the collection will be released on November 15, 2022, featuring three new essays and an audiobook version recorded by Abdurraqib himself.

Abdurraqib published Go Ahead in the Rain: Notes to A Tribe Called Quest in 2019 as part of University of Texas Press's American Music Series, edited by Jessica Hopper, David Menconi, and Oliver Wang. It debuted at number 13 on The New York Times bestseller list for paperback non-fiction and received strongly favorable reviews from critics. Reviewers stressed the accomplishment of integrating music history with both a broader history and a more personal one. Writing for Publishers Weekly, Ed Nawotka called the book "part academic monograph on the group and its music, part pocket history of hip-hop, part memoir, and part epistolary elegy. It is a book that conveys the wonder of being a fan and the visceral impact of experiencing the feeling of having oneself reflected back in music and pop culture." For NPR Lily Meyer praised Abdurraqib's "seemingly limitless capacity to share what moves him, which means that to read Go Ahead in the Rain, you don't need to be a Tribe Called Quest fan: Abdurraqib will make you one." The book was a finalist for the Kirkus Prize in Nonfiction and longlisted for the National Book Award for Nonfiction.

In January 2018, Abdurraqib announced he had signed a two-book deal with Random House; announced as a nonfiction book They Don't Dance No' Mo''' on the history of black performance in the United States, to be published in 2020 and an essay collection following up on They Can't Kill Us Until They Kill Us.About They Can't Kill Us, a review from Booklist wrote: "Abdurraqib writes with uninhibited curiosity and insight about music and its ties to culture and memory, life and death, on levels personal, political, and universal... Abdurraqib’s poignant critiques, a catalog of the current moment and all that preceded it, inspire us to listen with our whole selves."

The first book in the Random House deal was retitled A Little Devil in America: Notes in Praise of Black Performance and was released March 30, 2021. A Little Devil received a starred prepublication review in Publishers Weekly, which wrote: "Filled with nuance and lyricism, Abdurraqib's luminous survey is stunning." Kirkus called the book: "A thoughtful memoir rolled into a set of joined essays on life, death, and the Black experience in America....Another winner from Abdurraqib, a writer always worth paying attention to." Abdurraqib himself describes A Little Devil in America as "a catalogue of excitements". The book was awarded the 2022 Andrew Carnegie Medal for Excellence in Nonfiction. It was also awarded the 2021 Gordon Burn Prize.

 Honors 
In 2017, Abdurraqib received an honorary degree in human ecology from the College of the Atlantic. The Crown Ain't Worth Much was a finalist for the Eric Hoffer Book Award and nominated for a 2017 Hurston-Wright Legacy Award. They Can't Kill Us Until They Kill Us was named a best book of 2017 by numerous outlets, including NPR, Pitchfork, the Los Angeles Review, the Chicago Tribune, Stereogum, the National Post (Canada), Paste, the CBC, and Esquire. Go Ahead in the Rain: Notes to A Tribe Called Quest was a finalist for the 2019 Kirkus Prize in Nonfiction and was longlisted for the 2019 National Book Award for Nonfiction.

In June 2021, Cbus Libraries announced they are commissioning The People’s Mural of Columbus, which will feature Abdurraqib. The mural is set to be completed in August 2021 in the writer's hometown of Columbus, Ohio.

Abdurraqib was awarded a MacArthur Fellowship in 2021.

Personal life
In 2017, Abdurraqib moved back to Columbus, Ohio. He previously lived in New Haven, Connecticut.

Works
 Again I Wait For This To Pull Apart (as Hanif Willis-Abdurraqib; FreezeRay Press, 2015)
 The Crown Ain't Worth Much (as Hanif Willis-Abdurraqib; Button Poetry, 2016) ISBN 978-1-943735-04-4
 Vintage Sadness (as Hanif Willis-Abdurraqib; Big Lucks, 2017)
 They Can't Kill Us Until They Kill Us (Two Dollar Radio, 2017)
 Go Ahead in the Rain (University of Texas Press, 2019)A Fortune For Your Disaster  (Tin House, 2019)
 A Little Devil in America (Random House, 2021)
 There's Always This Year (Random House, forthcoming)
 Untitled essay collection (Random House, forthcoming)

References

External links
 Official site
 The Rumpus: The Conversation Hanif Willis-Abdurraqib and Paul Tran
 The Poetry Gods: Episode 3 featuring Hanif Willis-Abdurraqib
 Late Night Library: Late Night Conversation with Kristin Maffei. Featured Guest Hanif Willis-Abdurraqib
Excerpt from Go Ahead in the Right published by New York'' magazine

1983 births
20th-century African-American people
21st-century African-American writers
21st-century American essayists
21st-century American poets
African-American poets
American male non-fiction writers
American music critics
American music historians
American non-fiction writers
Butler University faculty
Capital University alumni
Historians from Ohio
Living people
MacArthur Fellows
Poets from Ohio
Writers from Columbus, Ohio
African-American non-fiction writers
American male essayists